Bembézar Reservoir is a reservoir in Hornachuelos, province of Córdoba, Andalusia, Spain. It is located in the Sierra de Hornachuelos, a mountain range of the Sierra Morena.

See also 
 List of reservoirs and dams in Andalusia
 Sierra Morena

External links 

 Agencia del agua Junta de Andalucía 
 Reservoirs status summary 
 Confederación Hidrográfica del Guadalquivir 

Reservoirs in Andalusia
Sierra Morena